Round Rock Cemetery is a cemetery in Round Rock, Williamson County, Texas, United States.

Notable burials
 Barbette (performer) (1899–1973) – Actor, Trapeze Artist.

 Samuel “Sam” Bass – (1851–1878), Western Outlaw.

References

External links

 
 Round Rock Cemetery at Find a Grave
 Cemetery: Round Rock at Williamson County Historical Commission
 Round Rock Cemetery at Williamson County Texas History

Cemeteries in Texas
Round Rock, Texas
African-American cemeteries